Saltpetre is an unincorporated community located in Wayne County, West Virginia, United States.

The community takes its name from the local saltpetre manufacturing industry.

References 

Unincorporated communities in West Virginia
Unincorporated communities in Wayne County, West Virginia